Victoria Upper Lake is a meltwater lake at the terminus of Victoria Upper Glacier in Victoria Land. It was named for its position at the terminus of the glacier by American geologist Parker E. Calkin, in 1964.

Lakes of Victoria Land
McMurdo Dry Valleys